Great Controversy may refer to:
 The Great Controversy (book), a book by Ellen G. White
 Great Controversy theme, the Seventh-Day-Adventist theological concept
 Great Controversy (album), an album by Luciano

See also
 The Great Devonian Controversy
 Great rites controversy
 Great Stirrup Controversy